Jafarabad (also Romanized as Ja‘farābād; also known as Deh-e Īlkhānī and Īlkhānī) is a village in Dastgerdan Rural District, Dastgerdan District, Tabas County, South Khorasan Province, Iran. At the 2006 census, its population was 22, in 10 families.

References 

Populated places in Tabas County